Miguel Bryon Jr. (born January 10, 1995) is an American cyclist, who last rode for UCI Continental team .

Major results
2012
 Tour de l'Abitibi
1st Stages 1 & 5
2013
 2nd Ronde van Vlaanderen Juniores

References

External links

1995 births
Living people
American male cyclists
Sportspeople from Miami
21st-century American people